Aharon Lichtenstein (May 23, 1933 – April 20, 2015) was an Orthodox rabbi and rosh yeshiva who was an authority in Jewish law (Halakha).

Biography
Aharon Lichtenstein was born to Rabbi Dr. Yechiel Lichtenstein and Bluma née Schwartz in Paris, France, but grew up in the United States, where he studied in Yeshiva Rabbi Chaim Berlin under Rabbi Yitzchak Hutner as well as Rabbi Ahron Soloveichik. He earned a BA and semicha ("rabbinic ordination") at Yeshiva University under Rabbi Joseph B. Soloveitchik, whose daughter, Tovah, he would later marry, and a PhD in English Literature at Harvard University, where he studied under Douglas Bush.

Lichtenstein married Dr. Tovah Soloveitchik on January 26, 1960. They had six children: Mosheh, Yitzchak, Meir, Esti, Shai and Tonya.

After serving as Rosh Yeshiva/Kollel at Yeshiva University for several years, Lichtenstein answered Rabbi Yehuda Amital's request in 1971 to join him at the helm of Yeshivat Har Etzion, located in Gush Etzion, and moved to Jerusalem.  He maintained a close connection to Yeshiva University as a Rosh Kollel for the Gruss Institute in Jerusalem, an affiliate of Yeshiva University and its rabbinical school, Rabbi Isaac Elchanan Theological Seminary.

In 2005, he and his wife moved to Alon Shvut, where Yeshivat Har Etzion is located.

On January 4, 2006, Rabbi Yaakov Medan and Rabbi Baruch Gigi were officially invested as co-roshei yeshiva alongside Amital and Lichtenstein, with an eye toward Amital's intention to retire.  On October 28, 2008, Lichtenstein's eldest son, Rabbi Mosheh Lichtenstein, was officially invested as co-Rosh Yeshiva, simultaneous with Amital's official retirement, this time with an eye toward Aharon Lichtenstein's eventual plan to retire.

He was committed to intensive and original Torah study and articulated a bold Jewish worldview embracing elements of modernity within the framework of a Torah life, reflecting the tradition of his teacher and father-in-law, Joseph B. Soloveitchik in line with Centrist Orthodoxy.

Lichtenstein was awarded the Israel Prize for Jewish Literature on Israeli Independence Day: May 6, 2014. He died on April 20, 2015. He was a source of inspiration for a wide circle of Jewry, for both his educational attainments and his intellectual and spiritual leadership. He was especially admired by many centrist Modern Orthodox leaders as well as many in the Religious Zionist camp.

Works

Henry More: The Rational Theology of a Cambridge Platonist, (PhD Dissertation) Cambridge: Harvard University Press, 1962.
By His Light: Character and Values in the Service of God, based on Lichtenstein's addresses and adapted by Reuven Ziegler  revised edition (Maggid Books, 2016)
Leaves of Faith (vol. 1): The World of Jewish Learning
Leaves of Faith (vol. 2): The World of Jewish Living
Varieties of Jewish Experience
Minchat Aviv: Chiddushim veIyyunim baShas: Edited by Elyakim Krumbein, Maggid Books, 2014 
Mussar Aviv: Al Mussar, Emuna veChevra: Edited by Aviad Hacohen and Reuven Ziegler Maggid Books, 2016 
Halakha and Humanism: Essays on the Thought and Scholarship of Rabbi Aharon Lichtenstein, by Yitzchak Blau (Editor), Alan Jotkowitz (Editor), Reuven Ziegler (Editor)
A Life Steady and Whole: Recollections and Appreciations of Rabbi Aharon Lichtenstein, zt"l: Edited by Joel B. Wolowelsky and Elka Weber Ktav, 2018 
Return and Renewal: Reflections on Teshuva and Spiritual Growth : Adapted and edited by Michael S. Berger and Reuven Ziegler Maggid Books, 2018 

Based on Lichtenstein's Talmud classes at Yeshivat Har Etzion, his students' notes have been edited and published as Shiurei Harav Aharon Lichtenstein on Tohorot, Zevahim, the eighth chapter of Bava Metzia, the third chapter of Bava Batra, the Ramban's pamphlet on Dinah DiGarmi, the first chapter of Pesahim, Masechet Horayot, and several critical chapters of Gittin.

Family Tree

References

External links
 Developing a Torah Personality - Series of shiurim based on addresses by Harav Aharon Lichtenstein, posted by The Israel Koschitzky Virtual Beit Midrash of Yeshivat Har Etzion
 "An Ideal Rosh Yeshiva". "a broad overview of the recent volumes of Rav Aharon Lichtenstein's thought. "Edah Journal 5:1 (Tammuz, 2005)] (PDF), Dr Alan Brill
 Bibliography of Harav Aharon Lichtenstein - Posted by the Israel Koschitzky Virtual Beit Midrash of Yeshivat Har Etzion
 "In Search of the Moderate Voice", Jewish Ideas Daily
 Tribute to Rabbi Lichtenstein
 An archive of eulogies, in written, audio and video format
 Several views of Rabbi Lichtenstein

1933 births
2015 deaths
Rabbis from Paris
French emigrants to the United States
Harvard University alumni
20th-century American rabbis
21st-century Israeli rabbis
American Modern Orthodox rabbis
American emigrants to Israel
Israeli Orthodox rabbis
Religious Zionist rosh yeshivas
Rabbi Isaac Elchanan Theological Seminary semikhah recipients
Yeshiva University rosh yeshivas
Yeshivat Har Etzion